Artisan Center Theater is a community theater based in the Dallas/Fort Worth area. The theater operates a 195-seat, theater in the round that features musicals.  Additionally, it has a second stage of 150-seats where performances of comedies, light dramas, musical reviews and children performing for children in the Artisan Children's Theater. Artisan Center Theater is open year-round daily except for Sundays and Wednesdays. Artisan produces over 15 shows per year, from Broadway classics to some lesser known straight plays with over 100,000 patrons annually.

History

Artisan Center Theater opened its doors March 2003 with the southern comedy Steel Magnolias.  Its first home was located in the North Hills Mall, North Richland Hills, TX.  When the North Hills Mall closed in January 2005, Artisan relocated next to the former Belaire Theater in the Belaire Shopping Plaza.

The theater is located at 444 E. Pipeline Road, Hurst, Texas 76053, (817) 284-1200.
Artisan produces year round plays and musicals totaling twenty two productions in 2016.

Programs

Artisan Children's Theater

Shortly after opening its doors, Artisan started Artie's Playhouse, an interactive theater for children.  Each play, using song, dance and dialogue, emphasizes different character values and features performances by children.  Artie's Playhouse is now called Artisan Children's Theater with multiple performances per week.

The Artisan Academy

The Artisan Academy is a series of classes designed to expose youth, ages 3 and up, to performance in a live theater setting. Classes follow the local school district calendar, with additional workshops offered in summer months. Classes in creative dramatics, acting, musical theater, dance, improvisation and technical skills are in session year round.

References
 Live Theatre League of Tarrant County   
 Guide to Fort Worth, Texas Entertainment 

Theatres in Texas
Education in Tarrant County, Texas
Buildings and structures in Tarrant County, Texas
Tourist attractions in Tarrant County, Texas